Kazimierz Junosza-Stępowski (26 November 1880 – 5 July 1943) was a Polish stage and film actor. He was a legendary figure in Polish cinema who had appeared in the earliest Polish films in 1902. Junosza-Stępowski was killed while trying to protect his wife from members of the Polish Home Army, who had discovered she was an informer for the Gestapo.

He was married twice. His first wife was Helena Jankowska (d. 1915). In 1922 he married Iza Galewska.

Selected filmography
 Uwiedziona (1931)
 Córka generała Pankratowa (1934)
 Młody las (1934)
 Kochaj tylko mnie (1935)
 Pan Twardowski (1936)
 Bohaterowie Sybiru (1936)
 Róża (1936)
 Trędowata (1936)
 Wierna rzeka (1936)
 Znachor (1937)
 Profesor Wilczur (1938)
 Kobiety nad przepaścią (1938)
 Wrzos (1935)
 Ostatnia brygada (1938)
 Second Youth (1938)
 Rena (1938)
 Florian (1938)
 Sygnaly (1938)
 Doktór Murek (1939)

References

Bibliography
 Haltof, Marek.  Polish Film and the Holocaust: Politics and Memory. Berghahn Books, 2012.
 Skaff, Sheila. The Law of the Looking Glass: Cinema in Poland, 1896–1939. Ohio University Press, 2008.

External links

1880 births
1943 deaths
Polish male stage actors
Polish male film actors
Polish male silent film actors
Actors from Venice
19th-century Polish male actors
20th-century Polish male actors
Deaths by firearm in Poland
Polish civilians killed in World War II
People executed by the Polish Underground State